Tenedos was a fortified coast-town in the west of ancient Pamphylia, 20 stadia to the west of Attalia.

Its site is located on the Arab Su, Asiatic Turkey.

References

Populated places in ancient Pamphylia
Former populated places in Turkey